An Einstein ring, also known as an Einstein–Chwolson ring or Chwolson ring (named for Orest Chwolson), is created when light from a galaxy or star passes by a massive object en route to the Earth. Due to gravitational lensing, the light is diverted, making it seem to come from different places. If source, lens, and observer are all in perfect alignment, the light appears as a ring.

Introduction 
Gravitational lensing is predicted by Albert Einstein's theory of general relativity.  Instead of light from a source traveling in a straight line (in three dimensions), it is bent by the presence of a massive body, which distorts spacetime. An Einstein Ring is a special case of gravitational lensing, caused by the exact alignment of the source, lens, and observer. This results in symmetry around the lens, causing a ring-like structure.

The size of an Einstein ring is given by the Einstein radius. In radians, it is

where

  is the gravitational constant,
  is the mass of the lens,
  is the speed of light,
  is the angular diameter distance to the lens,
  is the angular diameter distance to the source, and
  is the angular diameter distance between the lens and the source.

Over cosmological distances  in general.

History 

The bending of light by a gravitational body was predicted by Albert Einstein in 1912, a few years before the publication of general relativity in 1916 (Renn et al. 1997). The ring effect was first mentioned in the academic literature by Orest Khvolson in a short article in 1924, in which he mentioned the “halo effect” of gravitation when the source, lens, and observer are in near-perfect alignment. Einstein remarked upon this effect in 1936 in a paper prompted by a letter by a Czech engineer, R W Mandl, but stated

However, Einstein was only considering the chance of observing Einstein rings produced by stars, which is low – the chance of observing those produced by larger lenses such as galaxies or black holes is higher since the angular size of an Einstein ring increases with the mass of the lens.

The first complete Einstein ring, designated B1938+666, was discovered by collaboration between astronomers at the University of Manchester and NASA's Hubble Space Telescope in 1998.

There have apparently not been any observations of a star forming an Einstein ring with another star, but there is a 45% chance of this happening in early May, 2028 when Alpha Centauri A passes between us and a distant red star.

Known Einstein rings 

Hundreds of gravitational lenses are currently known. About half a dozen of them are partial Einstein rings with diameters up to an arcsecond, although as either the mass distribution of the lenses is not perfectly axially symmetrical, or the source, lens, and observer are not perfectly aligned, we have yet to see a perfect Einstein ring. Most rings have been discovered in the radio range. The degree of completeness needed for an image seen through a gravitational lens to qualify as an Einstein ring is yet to be defined.

The first Einstein ring was discovered by Hewitt et al. (1988), who observed the radio source MG1131+0456 using the Very Large Array. This observation saw a quasar lensed by a nearer galaxy into two separate but very similar images of the same object, the images stretched round the lens into an almost complete ring. These dual images are another possible effect of the source, lens, and observer not being perfectly aligned.

The first complete Einstein ring to be discovered was B1938+666, which was found by King et al. (1998) via optical follow-up with the Hubble Space Telescope of a gravitational lens imaged with MERLIN. The galaxy causing the lens at B1938+666 is an ancient elliptical galaxy, and the image we see through the lens is a dark dwarf satellite galaxy, which we would otherwise not be able to see with current technology.

In 2005, the combined power of the Sloan Digital Sky Survey (SDSS) with the Hubble Space Telescope was used in the Sloan Lens ACS (SLACS) Survey to find 19 new gravitational lenses, 8 of which showed Einstein rings, these are the 8 shown in the adjacent image. As of 2009, this survey has found 85 confirmed gravitational lenses but there is not yet a number for how many show Einstein rings. This survey is responsible for most of the recent discoveries of Einstein rings in the optical range, following are some examples which were found:

FOR J0332-3557, discovered by Remi Cabanac et al. in 2005, notable for its high redshift which allows us to use it to make observations about the early universe.
The "Cosmic Horseshoe" is a partial Einstein ring which was observed through the gravitational lens of LRG 3-757, a distinctively large Luminous Red Galaxy. It was discovered in 2007 by V. Belokurov et al.
SDSSJ0946+1006, the "double Einstein ring" was discovered by Raphael Gavazzi and Tomasso Treu in 2008, notable for the presence of multiple rings observed through the same gravitational lens, the significance of which is explained in the next section on extra rings.
Another example is the radio/X-Ray Einstein ring around PKS 1830-211, which is unusually strong in radio. It was discovered in X-Ray by Varsha Gupta et al. at the Chandra X-Ray observatory It is also notable for being the first case of a quasar being lensed by an almost face-on spiral galaxy.

Galaxy MG1654+1346 features a radio ring. The image in the ring is that of a quasar radio lobe, discovered in 1989 by G.Langston et al.

Extra rings 

Using the Hubble Space Telescope, a double ring has been found by Raphael Gavazzi of the STScI and Tommaso Treu of the University of California, Santa Barbara. This arises from the light from three galaxies at distances of 3, 6, and 11 billion light years. Such rings help in understanding the distribution of dark matter, dark energy, the nature of distant galaxies, and the curvature of the universe. The odds of finding such a double ring around a massive galaxy are 1 in 10,000. Sampling 50 suitable double rings would provide astronomers with a more accurate measurement of the dark matter content of the universe and the equation of state of the dark energy to within 10 percent precision.

Simulation 
Below in the Gallery section is a simulation depicting a zoom on a Schwarzschild black hole in the plane of the Milky Way between us and the centre of the galaxy. The first Einstein ring is the most distorted region of the picture and shows the galactic disc. The zoom then reveals a series of 4 extra rings, increasingly thinner and closer to the black hole shadow. They are multiple images of the galactic disk. The first and third correspond to points which are behind the black hole (from the observer's position) and correspond here to the bright yellow region of the galactic disc (close to the galactic center), whereas the second and fourth correspond to images of objects which are behind the observer, which appear bluer, since the corresponding part of the galactic disc is thinner and hence dimmer here.

Gallery

See also 

 Einstein Cross
 Einstein radius
 SN Refsdal

References

Journals 

  (refers to FOR J0332-3357)
  (The first paper to propose rings)
  (The famous Einstein Ring paper)

News 

  (refers to FOR J0332-3357)

Further reading 
 

Effects of gravitation
Ring
Optical phenomena
Gravitational lensing